The Great Falls Air Defense Sector (GFADS) is an inactive United States Air Force organization.  Its last assignment was with the Air Defense Command 29th Air Division,  being stationed at Malmstrom Air Force Base, Montana.  It was inactivated on 1 April 1966.

History
GFADS was established in March 1959 assuming control of former ADC Central Air Defense Force units with a mission to provide air defense of central Montana.  The organization provided command and control over several aircraft and radar squadrons.

On 15 February 1960 the new Semi Automatic Ground Environment (SAGE) Direction Center (DC-20) became operational.    DC-20  was equipped with dual AN/FSQ-7 Computers.   The day-to-day operations of the command was to train and maintain tactical flying units flying jet interceptor aircraft (F-94 Starfire; F-102 Delta Dagger; F-106 Delta Dart) in a state of readiness with training missions and series of exercises with SAC and other units simulating interceptions of incoming enemy aircraft.

The Sector was inactivated on 1 April 1966 as part of ADC reorganization and consolidation, the command being redesignated as the 28th Air Division.

Lineage
 Established as Great Falls Air Defense Sector on 1 March 1959
 Inactivated on 1 April 1966; redesignated as 28th Air Division

Assignments
 29th Air Division, 21 January 1960 – 1 April 1966

Stations
 Malmstrom AFB, Montana, 1 January 1960 – 1 April 1966

Components

Interceptor squadrons
 5th Fighter-Interceptor Squadron
 Minot AFB, North Dakota, 25 June 1963-1 April 1966
 13th Fighter-Interceptor Squadron
 Minot AFB, North Dakota, 25 June 1963-1 April 1966
 29th Fighter-Interceptor Squadron
 Malmstron AFB, Montana,  1953-1968

Radar squadrons

 681st Radar Squadron
 Cut Bank AFS, Montana, 1 July 1960-25 June 1965
 694th Radar Squadron
 Lewistown AFS, Montana, 1 July 1960-1 April 1966
 706th Radar Squadron
 Dickinson AFS, North Dakota, 25 June 1963-25 June 1965
 716th Radar Squadron
 Kalispell AFS, Montana, 1 July 1960-1 April 1966
 778th Radar Squadron
 Harve AFS, Montana, 1 July 1960-1 April 1966

 779th Radar Squadron
 Opheim AFS, Montana, 25 June 1963-1 April 1966
 780th Radar Squadron
 Fortuna AFS, North Dakota, 25 June 1963-1 April 1966
 786th Radar Squadron
 Minot AFS, North Dakota, 25 June 1963-1 April 1966
 801st Radar Squadron
 Malmstrom AFB, Montana, 1 July 1960-1 April 1966
 902d Radar Squadron
 Miles City AFS, Montana, 25 June 1963-1 April 1966

See also
 List of USAF Aerospace Defense Command General Surveillance Radar Stations
 Aerospace Defense Command Fighter Squadrons

References

  A Handbook of Aerospace Defense Organization 1946 - 1980,  by Lloyd H. Cornett and Mildred W. Johnson, Office of History, Aerospace Defense Center, Peterson Air Force Base, Colorado
 Winkler, David F. (1997), Searching the skies: the legacy of the United States Cold War defense radar program. Prepared for United States Air Force Headquarters Air Combat Command.
 Maurer, Maurer (1983). Air Force Combat Units Of World War II. Maxwell AFB, Alabama: Office of Air Force History. .
 Ravenstein, Charles A. (1984). Air Force Combat Wings Lineage and Honors Histories 1947-1977. Maxwell AFB, Alabama: Office of Air Force History. .
 Radomes.org Great Falls Air Defense Sector

Air Defense
1959 establishments in Montana
1966 disestablishments in Montana